"We'll Sing in the Sunshine" is a 1964 hit song written and recorded by Gale Garnett which reached No. 2 in Canada, and No. 4 on the U.S. Billboard Hot 100 chart for the week ending 17 October 1964. It also enjoyed success on easy listening and country music radio stations, spending seven weeks at No. 1 on the Billboard Easy Listening chart and No. 42 on the country chart. The Cash Box Top 100 ranked "We'll Sing in the Sunshine" at No. 1 for the week of 31 October 1964, and it also reached No. 1 in Garnett's native New Zealand that November. In Australia, "We'll Sing in the Sunshine" afforded Garnett a Top Ten hit with a No. 10 peak in October 1964. Garnett's sole Top 40 hit, "We'll Sing in the Sunshine" won the Grammy Award for Best Ethnic or Traditional Folk Recording in 1965.

The song was inducted into the Canadian Songwriters Hall of Fame in 2015.

Lyrics
In the song, a woman tells her would-be lover that she does not believe in long-term relationships. She says she will give him a year, then leave him, and assures him he will look back fondly on their year together.

Chart history

Weekly charts
Gale Garnett

The Lancastrians

LaWanda Lindsey

Helen Reddy

Year-end charts

Cover versions
In the UK, "We'll Sing in the Sunshine" was covered by The Lancastrians in a version produced by Shel Talmy and featuring guitar work from both Jimmy Page and Big Jim Sullivan. It charted at No. 44 in the UK in December 1964. Mark Wynter had a non-charting UK single release of "We'll Sing in the Sunshine" in 1966. Sonny & Cher recorded the song for their 1967 album, In Case You're in Love, and Wanda Jackson covered it on her 1969 album  The Happy Side of Wanda.

"We'll Sing in the Sunshine" was a minor C&W hit in 1970 for LaWanda Lindsey, reaching No. 63, serving as the title cut for Lindsey's album.

Helen Reddy remade the song, with Kim Fowley producing, for her May 1978 album release We'll Sing in the Sunshine with the track being released as advance single on 28 March, with a special 1 March advance release in Hawaii, in hopes a new single release from Reddy would foment interest in the singer's high-profile Easter Sunday (26 March) Sheraton Waikiki shows, and also that a "sunshine" song might be afforded an early breakout in a tropical region. The single failed to arouse any evident Top 40 radio interest, becoming the first lead single from a Helen Reddy album to fall short of the Hot 100 in Billboard: "We'll Sing in the Sunshine" afforded Reddy her last Top 20 ranking on Billboard'''s Adult Contemporary chart. Reddy's live recording of "We'll Sing in the Sunshine" was featured on her concert album Live in London recorded at the Palladium in May 1978. In 1984, Dolly Parton sang the song on her album of covers, The Great Pretender'', released by RCA Records. It was one of her last records with RCA.

See also
List of number-one adult contemporary singles of 1964 (U.S.)
The Marketts

References

External links
Song lyrics
 

1964 songs
1964 singles
Cashbox number-one singles
Gale Garnett songs
Helen Reddy songs
LaWanda Lindsey songs
RCA Victor singles
Capitol Records singles
Grammy Award for Best Ethnic or Traditional Folk Recording